Los enredos de una gallega ("The Entanglements of a Galician Woman") is a 1951 Mexican comedy film directed by Fernando Soler and starring Niní Marshall and Fernando Soto.

Plot
Cándida (Niní Marshall) is a Galician woman who lives in Mexico and earns a living selling lottery tickets. Her dream is to be able to buy a restaurant, but she doesn't have enough money. In her quest to try to make it, she stumbles upon a scammer, Filogono (Fernando Soto). In a stroke of luck she wins the first prize of the lottery, but the bad luck for her continues because she cannot find the ticket.

Cast
 Niní Marshall as Cándida
 Fernando Soto as Filogonio (as Fernando Soto "Mantequilla")
 Joaquín Roche hijo as Beto
 Ramón Gay	as El Bicicletas
 Sara Montes as Magda
 Antonio Bravo as Don Severo
 Nacho Contla as Don Feliciano
 Eduardo Alcaraz as Don León
 Aurora Ruiz as Doña María
 Luis Badillo as Cándida's Yucatecan Boss
 Emilio Brillas as Vacuum Cleaner Salesman
 Roberto Cobo as El Fenómeno, bullfighter
 Toña la Negra as Singer
 Víctor Alcocer as Restaurant customer (uncredited)
 Daniel Arroyo as Restaurant customer (uncredited)
 Ricardo Avendaño as Bartender (uncredited)
 Victorio Blanco as Funeral home customer (uncredited)
 Josefina Burgos as Restaurant waitress (uncredited)
 Rodolfo Calvo as Judge (uncredited)
 Lupe Carriles as Neighbor (uncredited)
 Enrique Carrillo as Policeman (uncredited)
 Alfonso Carti as Cándida's Client (uncredited)
 Enedina Díaz de León as Neighbor (uncredited)
 Cecilia Leger as Neighbor (uncredited)
 Pepe Martínez as Mute Man (uncredited)
 Álvaro Matute as Reporter (uncredited)
 Joaquín Roche as Cabaret waiter (uncredited)
 Manuel Trejo Morales as Police chief (uncredited)
 Sergio Virel as Friend of El Fenómeno (uncredited)
 Enrique Zambrano as Friend of El Bicicletas (uncredited)

References

External links
 

1951 films
1950s Spanish-language films
Mexican comedy films
1951 comedy films
Mexican black-and-white films
1950s Mexican films